Margaret Bloy Graham (2 November 1920 – 22 January 2015) was a Canadian creator of children's books, primarily an illustrator of picture books. She is best known for her work on Harry the Dirty Dog (1956) and other books in the Harry series written by her then husband Gene Zion.

Early life
Graham was born in Toronto. Her father, Malcolm Robert Graham, was a physician and her mother Florence (née Bloy) was a nurse. When Graham was one, the family moved to Sandwich, Ontario (now part of Windsor), where her father became the superintendent of the sanatorium. Her childhood was spent in Ontario, but she spent her summer holidays abroad, either with her grandfather in England or an aunt in the United States. The family returned to Toronto when she was ten. She attended Saturday morning classes at the Art Gallery of Ontario.

Graham majored in art history at the University of Toronto, graduating in 1943. After graduation, she attended a summer course at the venerable Art Students League in New York City. She later supplemented her studies at the Institute of Fine Arts at New York University and also the New School for Social Research.
	
She decided to stay in New York to establish a career as a commercial artist. From 1944 to 1945 she worked as a ship draftsman for Gibbs & Cox and in 1946 she started work in the art department of Condé Nast Publications, where she remained until 1956.

Writer and illustrator
Graham met her first husband Gene Zion (1913-1975) at Condé Nast. They were married in July 1948.

Zion was urged by his new wife and also his editor, Ursula Nordstrom of Harper and Brothers, to write children's books. He remembers that it was Graham’s sketch of children gathering apples in an orchard, done several years earlier in Canada, that inspired his first book, All Falling Down (1951).

The husband-and-wife team became famous for the Harry series of books, beginning with Harry the Dirty Dog (1956) and followed by No Roses for Harry! (1958), Harry and the Lady Next Door (1960) and Harry By the Sea (1965). The collaboration ended with their divorce in 1968.

Graham received two Caldecott Honors, one for her work on All Falling Down, the second for her work on The Storm Book.
	
Graham launched her own writing career around the time of the divorce with Be Nice to Spiders (1967). She later developed her own canine hero, Benjy, through a series of books.

Later life
Graham was remarried in 1972 to a merchant-ship officer, Oliver W. Holmes, Jr. She lived in retirement in Cambridge, Massachusetts.

Major works

Author and illustrator

Illustrator

References

Biographical sources
Commire, A. (1977). GRAHAM, Margaret Bloy 1920- . In Something about the author (Vol. 11, pp. 119–120). Detroit MI: Gale Research
Commire, A. (1980). ZION, (Eu)Gene 1913-1975. In Something about the author (Vol. 18, pp. 305–306). Detroit MI: Gale Research
Graham, M.B. (1963). Margaret Bloy Graham 1920- . In M. Fuller (Ed.), More junior authors (pp. 102–103). New York: H.W. Wilson
Kingman, L., Foster, J., & Lontoft, R.G. (Eds.). (1968). Graham, Margaret Bloy. In Illustrators of children’s books: 1957-1966 (p. 116). Boston: The Horn Book
Literature Resource Center. (2002). Margaret Bloy Graham 1920- . In Contemporary authors online, from http://galenet.galegroup.com [University of Toronto Libraries]
Pitchford, T.R. (2006). Graham, Margaret Bloy. In J. Zipes (Ed.), The Oxford encyclopedia of children’s literature [Electronic version]. Retrieved October 19, 2006, from http://www.oxford-childrensliterature.com [University of Toronto Libraries]
Silvey, A. (Ed.). (2002). Graham, Margaret Bloy. In The essential guide to children’s books and the creators (p. 181). Boston: Houghton Mifflin
Ward, M.E., & Marquardt, D.A. (1975). GRAHAM, Margaret Bloy, 1920- . In Illustrators of Books for Young People (2nd ed., p. 69). Metuchen NJ: Scarecrow

External links
 
 Gene Zion Collection at CLRC, University of Minnesota – with biographical sketch
 

1920 births
Canadian children's book illustrators
Canadian children's writers
University of Toronto alumni
Art Students League of New York alumni
New York University Institute of Fine Arts alumni
Writers from Toronto
2015 deaths
Canadian expatriates in the United States